Route 490, also known as Stephenville Access Road and Katarina Roxon Way, is a  north–south highway on the western coast of Newfoundland in the Canadian province of Newfoundland and Labrador. It is one of two highways that connects the town of Stephenville with the Trans-Canada Highway (Route 1), with the other being Route 460 (Hansen Memorial Highway).

Route description

Route 490 begins at an interchange with Route 1 (Exit 2) in the community of Barachois Brook and heads north through rural areas to have an intersection and become concurrent with Route 461. This is the only example of a road concurrency in the entire province of Newfoundland and Labrador. They head north along the coastline to have an intersection with a local road leading to Mattis Point before crossing a bridge over an inlet to enter the town of Stephenville Crossing. Route 490 and Route 461 almost immediately split at a fork in the road, with Route 490 bypassing downtown on its western side along the coast. Route 490 now leaves town and winds its way northwest through rural hilly terrain for several kilometres to enter the Stephenville town limits and pass by the site of the former Ernest Harmon Air Force Base. The highway now passes through wooded areas for a few kilometres before making a sharp right turn at an intersection with Minnesota Drive. Route 490 comes to an end shortly thereafter at an intersection with Route 460 just northeast of downtown.

Major intersections

References

490